Vibrio furnissii is a Gram-negative, rod-shaped bacterium. Its type strain is ATCC 35016 (= CDC B3215). V. furnissii is aerogenic (gas-producing), and uses L-rhamnose, L-arginine, L-arabinose, maltose, and D-mannitol, but not L-lysine, L-ornithine, or lactose. It has been isolated from patients with gastroenteritis, bacteremia, skin lesions, and sepsis.

References

Further reading

External links

Type strain of Vibrio furnissii at BacDive -  the Bacterial Diversity Metadatabase

Vibrionales
Bacteria described in 1983